DAMRI Public Corporation (was Djawatan Angkoetan Motor Repoeblik Indonesia, lit. Motor Transport Enterprise of the Republic of Indonesia) is an Indonesian state-owned bus operator. Under further development as a public company, the name DAMRI is still used as a brand mark of this state-owned company that still carries out passenger and cargo transport using buses and trucks.

DAMRI has a service network that spreads nearly throughout all regions of Indonesia. In its business activities, DAMRI provides city transport, transport within province, intercity transport, airport transport, tourism transport, logistics transport, transport to isolated areas and inter-country transport.

History
After Indonesia proclaimed independence in 1945, Java Transportation Enterprise changed its name to Djawatan Pengangkoetan (Transport Enterprise) and Automobile Board changed its name to Djawatan Angkoetan Darat (Land Transport Enterprise) as both enterprises were taken over by the Indonesian Department of Transportation.

By 25 November 1946, both enterprises were merged, through a Ministry of Transportation announcement, into Djawatan Angkoetan Motor Repoeblik Indonesia (DAMRI). It was tasked to "operate land transportation by buses, trucks and other types of motor vehicles".

DAMRI has played an active role during the Indonesian National Revolution, especially during the resistance against the Dutch military aggressions.

In 1961, DAMRI was reorganized as a General Director Board. In 1965 the DAMRI BPU became a State Corporation, and in 1982 it was reorganized as a public corporation.

Services
DAMRI serves in some types of services. The services that are served by DAMRI are:

Airport transport 
Airport transport is one of the service segments that operates to and from airports. These airport transport segments do not only serve in Jakarta, Indonesia's, but already reach nearly all airports in Indonesia. This service that is oriented to the happiness of its customers, and will always give the best service with its cost that are relatively cheap, safe and comfortable. This service is called Angkutan Pemadu Moda (APM). Airports currently served by Perum DAMRI include Soekarno-Hatta International Airport, Juanda International Airport and Yogyakarta International Airport.

JA Connexion 
On 26 May 2017, BPTJ planned 12 bus routes from Soekarno-Hatta Airport to some hotels in Jakarta. Perum DAMRI will be operating one routes, which is Amaris Hotel Thamrin City – SHIA.

City bus transport 

City bus transport is a mode of transportation inside the city with a specified route. The service ranges into routes in cities, capital cities, provinces or districts. The service extends into in large Indonesian cities such as Medan, Batam, Padang, Palembang, Bandar Lampung, Bandung, Yogyakarta, Surakarta, Semarang, Jember, Surabaya, Makassar, Kendari and Manado.

Strategic Business Unit TransJakarta 
DAMRI operated 66 Zhongtong LCK6180GC Doosan CNG Euro V articulated buses for TransJakarta. Perum DAMRI also operated 21 INKA Inobus Cummins ATC 320 CNG Series, which are now retired for its contract period is over. Main corridors that are served are Corridor 5 (Kampung Melayu-Ancol) Corridor 8 (Harmoni-Lebak Bulus), Corridor 9 (Pluit-Pinang Ranti) and Corridor 10 (PGC-Tanjung Priok). As of January 2021, all operations of the Zhongtong units were ceased. In the near future, DAMRI will be testing an electric bus for TransJakarta.

Inter-city transport 

DAMRI serves an inter-city transport in Indonesia known as AKDP (Inter-City Inner Province) and AKAP (Inter-city Inter-Province)). This service serves from one city to another, and goes through province borders. Some are:

 Bandung - Kuningan (AKDP)
 Bandung - Indramayu (AKDP)
 Jakarta - Yogyakarta (AKAP)
 Jakarta - Lampung (AKAP)
 Yogyakarta - Temanggung (AKAP)
 Yogyakarta - Semarang (AKAP)
 Jakarta - Surabaya (AKAP)
 Jakarta - Purwokerto (AKAP)
 Malang - Palembang (AKAP)
 Pontianak - Pangkalan Bun (AKAP)
 Banjarmasin - Samarinda (AKAP)

International cross-border transport 
Inter-country transport is a mode of transportation from one city to another, across country borders. DAMRI operates inter-country transport across the Indonesia-Malaysia border, serving a route between Pontianak, Indonesia to Kuching, Malaysia. DAMRI has also opened a new service from Pontianak to Brunei Darussalam.

DAMRI is also in the process of opening inter-country transport to Papua Nugini and Timor Leste. The inter-country routes that are served by DAMRI are:

 Pontianak (Indonesia) – Kuching (Malaysia)
 Pontianak (Indonesia) – Bandar Seri Begawan (Brunei Darussalam)
 Kupang (Indonesia) - Dili (Timor Leste)
 Jayapura (Indonesia) – Vanimo (Papua New Guinea)

Pioneer transport 

DAMRI serves some remote areas that have not been served by other transport companies. Pioneer transport is a service that serves to the deeps of Indonesia, sometimes routes with unpaved roads. It mostly serves the deeps of Papua and Kalimantan, where the forests are still thick. Pioneer transport is an assignment from the government to meet the community's need for transportation so that children can go to school, logistics costs can be reduced, and produce can be distributed. Some routes served are:

 Surade – Sagaranteun (Sukabumi)
 Serang - Ciboleger (Lebak)
 Pangandaran – Sindang Barang (Cianjur)
 Sindang Barang (Cianjur) – Teugal Buleud (Sukabumi)
 Ponorogo – Telaga Sarangan (Magetan, East Java)
 Peusangan Siblah Krueng – Bireuen (Aceh)
 Ambon – Werinama (Seram Island)
 Nabire – Paniai (Papua)
 Jayapura - Senggi (Keerom)
 Jayapura – Sarmi (Papua)

Logistics
DAMRI uses trucks to deliver goods in collaboration with PT Pos Indonesia in Medan, Dumai, Surabaya and Mataram in primary and secondary pathways. DAMRI also serves freight transportation as a canal service from train logistics and other private parties.

Offices
Perum DAMRI head office
 Jl. Matraman Raya No. 25 East Jakarta 13140
 Telp. (021) 8583131 (Hunting) Fax. (021) 8504876

Regional division offices 
Regional Division I
 Jl. Angkasa No. 17 B Kemayoran Jakarta Pusat 10610
 Telp. (021) 4246802 Fax. (021) 4246802
 Regional Division I covers West Java, Sumatra

Regional Division II
 Jl. Mpu Tantular No. 8 Semarang 50175
 Telp. (024) 3544712 Fax. (024) 3586280
 Regional Division II covers Central Java, Kalimantan

Regional Division III
 Jl. Raya Kalirungkut No. 7A Surabaya 60293
 Telp. (031) 8490118 Fax. (031) 8490142
 Regional Division III covers East Java, Bali, Lombok, NTT, South Sulawesi

Regional Division IV
 Jl. Pasifik Indah No. 17 Ex Bengkel PU. Pasir II Jayapura 99117
 Telp. (0967) 5620177 Fax. (069) 5620177
 Regional Division IV covers Sulawesi (except South Sulawesi), Maluku, Papua

See also
 List of bus operator companies in Indonesia
 Ministry of State Owned Enterprises (Indonesia)

References

External links
 Official website

Public transport in Indonesia
Bus companies of Indonesia
Government-owned companies of Indonesia